Ketapang Station (formerly Banyuwangi Baru Station) is a railway station, managed by Kereta Api Indonesia, located at Ketapang, Kalipuro, Banyuwangi Regency, East Java. This station is at the most southeastern railway station in Southeast Asia.

History 
As of 1 December 2019, the station was renamed into "Ketapang Station".

Services 
The railway services that use this station :

Executive and Premium Economy class 
 Mutiara Timur to 
 Wijayakusuma to

Economy class 
 Sri Tanjung to 
 Probowangi to 
 Tawang Alun to

Local train 
 Pandanwangi to

References

External links 

Banyuwangi Regency
Railway stations in East Java
Railway stations opened in 1985
1985 establishments in Indonesia